Ameronothridae is a family of oribatids in the order Oribatida. There are about 8 genera and at least 30 described species in Ameronothridae.

Genera
 Alaskozetes Hammer, 1955
 Ameronothrus Berlese, 1896
 Aquanothrus Engelbrecht, 1975
 Capillibates Hammer, 1966
 Chudalupia Wallwork, 1981
 Halozetes Berlese, 1916
 Podacarus Grandjean, 1955
 Pseudantarcticola Balogh, 1970

References

Further reading

 
 
 
 

Acariformes
Acari families